The Anthropological Journal of European Cultures is a biannual peer-reviewed academic journal that was established in 1990 as the Anthropological Yearbook of European Cultures. It obtained its current title in 2008 when Berghahn Books took over as the publisher. The journal covers research addressing the cultural and social changes of the societies in contemporary Europe. The editors-in-chief are Elisabeth Timm (University of Münster) and Patrick Laviolette (University of Tartu and Institute of Advanced Study, New Europe College, Bucharest).

Editors-in-chief
The following persons are or have been editors-in-chief:
2017-2019: Ullrich Kockel & Elisabeth Timm
2006-2017: Ullrich Kockel
1990-2006: Ina-Maria Greverus, Christian Giordano

Abstracting and indexing 
The journal is abstracted and indexed in:

External links

Anthropology journals
Publications established in 1990
Biannual journals
English-language journals
Berghahn Books academic journals